James Frederick Thomas Bugental (December 25, 1915 – September 17, 2008) was one of the predominant theorists and advocates of the Existential-humanistic therapy movement.  He was a therapist, teacher and writer for over 50 years.  He received his Ph.D. from Ohio State University, was named a Fellow of the American Psychological Association in 1955, and was the first recipient of the APA's Division of Humanistic Psychology's Rollo May Award. He held leadership positions in a number of professional organizations, including president of the California State Psychological Association.

Theory
In "The Search for Authenticity" (1965), Bugental summarized the postulates of humanistic psychology, often quoted by other theorists:

 Human beings cannot be reduced to components.
 Human beings have in them a uniquely human context.
 Human consciousness includes an awareness of oneself in the context of other people.
 Human beings have choices and responsibilities.
 Human beings are intentional, they seek meaning, value and creativity.

Publications
 "The Search for Authenticity" (1965)
 "The Search for Existential Identity" (1976)
 "Psychotherapy and Process" (1978)
 "Intimate Journeys: Stories from Life-Changing Therapy" (1990)
 "The Art of the Psychotherapist" (1992)
 "Psychotherapy Isn't What You Think" (1999)

References

External links
 Excerpts from Psychotherapy Isn't What you Think, by James Bugental
 Existential-Humanistic Psychotherapy: An Interview with James Bugental, Ph.D.
 Existential-Humanistic Psychotherapy in Action: Psychotherapy Training Video featuring James Bugental

1915 births
2008 deaths
20th-century American psychologists
Human Potential Movement
Fellows of the American Psychological Association